The 2010 Korean Series began on Friday, 15 October, at the Munhak Baseball Stadium in Incheon. It featured the SK Wyverns, who had claimed home ground advantage by finishing in first place at the end of the season, and the Samsung Lions, who had finished second and had defeated the Doosan Bears in a best-of-5 playoff series (3 games to 2) to advance to the next round. The SK Wyverns won the series in four games, sweeping the Samsung Lions to collect their third Korean Series championship in four seasons and their third overall.

Matchups

Game 1
Friday, October 15, 2010 at Munhak Baseball Stadium in Incheon

Kim Kwang-hyun (SK) struck out a new record 6 consecutive batters in Korean Series. (previous record: Kim Soo-kyung (Hyundai) record 5 struck out consecutive batters in 2004)

Game 2
Saturday, October 16, 2010 at Munhak Baseball Stadium in Incheon

Choi Jeong (SK, 23 years and 230 days) set a record of youngest back-to-back home run in Korean Series and five overall. (previous record: Lee Jong-beom(Haitai) 27 years and 68 days in 1997)
Park Kyung-oan (SK, 38 years and 97 days) set a record of the oldest home run in Korean Series. (previous record: Park Jae-hong(SK) 36 years and 43 days in 2009)

Game 3
Monday, October 18, 2010 at Daegu Baseball Stadium in Daegu

Game 4
Tuesday, October 19, 2010 at Daegu Baseball Stadium in Daegu

First baseman/Right fielder Park Jung-kwon was named the series MVP.

References

Korean Series
Samsung Lions
SSG Landers
Korean Series